Varzea altamazonica is a species of skink found in Peru and Bolivia.

References

alatamazonica
Reptiles described in 2006
Taxa named by Aurélien Miralles
Taxa named by Cesar L. Barrio-Amoros
Taxa named by Gilson Rivas